Linognathidae is a family of lice in the order Psocodea. There are at least 3 genera and 70 described species in Linognathidae.

Genera
These three genera belong to the family Linognathidae:
 Linognathus Enderlein, 1905
 Prolinognathus Ewing, 1929
 Solenopotes Enderlein, 1904

References

Further reading

External links

 

Troctomorpha
Lice
Insect families